Ross Twell (born 4 July 1992) was a professional English darts player, who played in Professional Darts Corporation events.

He earned a PDC Tour Card in 2014. Twell regained his card in 2017 by finishing second on the 2016 PDC Development Tour rankings, thanks to winning 3 events along the way. Twell, was dubbed by many fellow players as being the “golden boy” of Lincolnshire darts.

References

External links

1992 births
Living people
English darts players
People from Lincolnshire
Professional Darts Corporation former tour card holders